3050 series may refer to:

Japanese train types
 Keisei 3050 series EMU
 Nagoya Municipal Subway 3050 series EMU